The Wargamer may refer to a
 The 1977-1990 print magazine, or 
 The wargamer.com web site, founded in 1995.